Małgorzata Rożniecka (born 1978, in Szczecin) is a Polish model and beauty queen who won Miss International 2001.

Her 2001 victory broke the four-year monopoly of Latin American countries of the crown. She is 1.78 m tall.

References

External links
  Małgorzata Rożniecka profile

1978 births
Living people
Models from Szczecin
Miss International winners
Miss International 2001 delegates
Polish female models
Polish beauty pageant winners